Madan Bhatia (August 1929 – 27 June 2013) was an Indian lawyer and parliamentarian. He served two terms as a nominated member of the Rajya Sabha from 1982 to 1988 and 1988 till 1994. He was born in Jhelum.

Sources
Brief Biodata

References

Nominated members of the Rajya Sabha
20th-century Indian lawyers
Indian National Congress politicians from Punjab, India
1929 births
2013 deaths